Benjamin Wynn, (Benjamin Matfield Wynn, born 1979) known also as Deru, is an American composer, sound designer and music producer mostly known for creating the sound design for the TV series Avatar: The Last Airbender. He has collaborated with composers such as Joby Talbot. He also produces electronic music under the name "Deru". He is the grandson of neurosurgeon Joseph Ransohoff.

Background
Wynn studied electronic music at the California Institute of the Arts, where he focused on synthesis, signal processing, acoustics, music theory and composition, and earned a bachelor's degree in music technology.

Collaboration
In 2007, Wynn (as Deru) collaborated with British composer Joby Talbot on the score to Wayne McGregor's ballet, "Genus", based on Charles Darwin's book, On the Origin of Species, commissioned by the Paris Opera Ballet. The ballet premiered at the Palais Garnier in October 2007 and was commissioned for a second round of performances in November 2009. The eight-part score combines electronics with a 10-part choir and string instruments. The score is available on Ant-Zen and Dear Oh Dear Records and was featured in the 2009 documentary, "La Danse: The Paris Opera Ballet". Genus had its North American premiere by the National Ballet of Canada at the Four Seasons Centre in March 2017 in Toronto, Canada.

The Track Team
Wynn is co-owner of a music and sound design company in Los Angeles called The Track Team. He was the force behind the sound design for all three seasons of Nickelodeon's hit television show, Avatar: The Last Airbender, which won a Peabody Award in 2008. Wynn was nominated for a Motion Picture Sound Editor's Golden Reel award in 2009 for his sound design work on Avatar: The Last Airbender.

He started The Track Team with co-founder Jeremy Zuckerman in 2004. Together they have created music for the Nickelodeon TV series, Kung Fu Panda: Legends of Awesomeness, the score for the feature films Just Peck and A Leading Man and music and sound design for DC Comics shorts. Wynn also worked on the sound design for the sequel to Avatar: The Last Airbender, The Legend of Korra. Ben and Jeremy won a 2012 Emmy Award for music editing for Kung Fu Panda: Legends of Awesomeness. In 2013, they were nominated for another Emmy Award for music editing for Kung Fu Panda: Legends of Awesomeness. They received their third Emmy Award nomination in 2014; and in 2015, they won their second Emmy Award for music editing for Kung Fu Panda: Legends of Awesomeness. In 2017, Wynn and Zuckerman were nominated for their fifth Emmy Award nomination, for music editing for Kung Fu Panda: Legends of Awesomeness.

In 2017, it was announced on The Track Team's Facebook page that Wynn and Zuckerman had decided to dissolve their company to pursue their own creative endeavors.

The Echo Society
Wynn is a founding member and Creative Director of The Echo Society, a Los Angeles-based composer collective and non-profit organization that premieres new orchestral works in singular, one-night only events throughout Los Angeles. The Echo Society's shows bring orchestral and electronic music to new audiences through uniquely immersive experiences. The collective consists of composers Joseph Trapanese, Rob Simonsen, Jeremy Zuckerman, Nathan Johnson (musician), Eskmo, and Judson Crane, as well as sound engineer Satoshi Noguchi and visual artist Effixx.

Deru
Wynn is also an electronic music producer under the name "Deru". He is signed to the label Friends of Friends and has released three albums on Mush Records, Merck Records, and Neo Ouija and many remixes and tracks for compilations for labels like Hometapes, Ghostly International, Hymen Records, 1320 Records, Unseen, and Mille Plateaux. His album, 1979, was released on June 17, 2014, as a limited-edition sculptural object, featuring nine tracks by Wynn and accompanied by nine short films by video artist Anthony Ciannamea, that are housed in a custom handheld video projector. He released another album, Torn In Two, on October 19, 2018.

In 2010, Deru and fellow electronic music producer Free the Robots joined the electronic music group The Glitch Mob on their nationwide "Drink the Sea" tour.

Deru scored the music and curated the soundtrack for the feature-length film, Outliers, Vol. I: Iceland. The score is based on his field recordings from a trip to Iceland in October 2011. The film premiered in Chicago in July 2012.

He also composed the music for a digital arts installation by Julie Weitz that was entitled Touch Museum and inspired by the phenomenon known as Autonomous sensory meridian response.

In 2018, Deru scored the music for the American science fiction web television show, Impulse (TV series). The series is executive produced by Lauren LeFranc, Doug Liman, David Bartis, and Gene Klein.

In 2019, Deru won a Webby award for his score for the Marvel podcast, “Wolverine: The Long Night”.

References

External links
 
 
 

1979 births
Living people
American male composers
21st-century American composers
Record producers from Illinois
21st-century American male musicians